Jann Ingi Petersen (born 7 January 1984) is a Faroese football midfielder. He is currently under contract with B68 Toftir. He usually plays as controlling midfielder.

Petersen is specialised in both penalty kicks and free kicks.

He has been capped for the Faroe Islands national team 23 times.

External links

Jann Ingi Petersen at NSÍ Runavík 

Living people
1984 births
Faroese footballers
Faroe Islands international footballers
Association football midfielders
Expatriate men's footballers in Denmark
NSÍ Runavík players
B68 Toftir players
Faroe Islands youth international footballers
Fremad Amager players